The Birmingham Special was a passenger train operated by the Southern Railway, Norfolk and Western Railway, and Pennsylvania Railroad in the southeastern United States. The train began service in 1909 and continued, with alterations, after Amtrak assumed control of most long-haul intercity passenger rail in the United States on May 1, 1971. The Birmingham Special is the namesake of the famed Glenn Miller big band tune "Chattanooga Choo Choo".

The Southern Railway introduced the Birmingham Special on May 17, 1909, running between Birmingham, Alabama and New York City via Atlanta, Georgia and Washington, D.C. The Southern operated the train between Birmingham and Washington, while the Pennsylvania Railroad carried through cars between Washington and New York. The train consisted of coaches, Pullman sleepers, and a dining car. Its road numbers on the Southern Railway were #29 (southbound) and #30 (northbound).

On May 15, 1932, the Southern re-routed the Birmingham Special via Chattanooga, Tennessee, Knoxville, Tennessee and Bristol, bypassing Atlanta. The Norfolk and Western Railway hauled the train between Lynchburg, Virginia and Bristol, creating an unusual (though not unique) situation of the Birmingham Special using two unconnected sections of the Southern Railway: Washington–Lynchburg and Bristol–Birmingham. Into the 1950s the train consist included several types of sleeping accommodations for the New York-Birmingham train.

It was while riding this incarnation of the train that Mack Gordon and Harry Warren wrote "Chattanooga Choo Choo". The song's lyrics, which do not mention the Birmingham Special directly by name, mention boarding the train on track 29 at Pennsylvania Station, which has never had a track 29. Also, when the song was recorded in 1941, the Birmingham Special used an electric, not steam, locomotive between New York and Washington. Ironically, the premier train of the Pennsylvania Railroad's rival, the New York Central Railroad's 20th Century Limited, used track 29 at Grand Central Terminal. The time points mentioned reflect liberties for rhyme and suggest the pre-Bristol reroute (when it passed through North Carolina, it did not yet serve Chattanooga).

The Pennsylvania ended through service north of Washington in 1956. By 1964 the sleeper service had been eliminated. However, the longer route, along the same trackage as far south as Chattanooga, the Southern's Pelican, retained sleeping cars. Through service to Memphis, Tennessee (connecting in Chattanooga) ended on January 31, 1967. The Southern Railway dropped the Birmingham Special name on February 1, 1970. Service south of Bristol ended August 11, 1970, although a rump train operated north from Birmingham to the Alabama/Tennessee border for a few more months. The train was the last to serve Chattanooga's Terminal Station.

The Norfolk & Western joined Amtrak upon the latter's start on May 1, 1971. However, Amtrak chose not to operate the Lynchburg–Bristol portion of the train. The Southern Railway, which had not initially joined Amtrak, continued to operate the unnamed train between Washington and Lynchburg until June 1, 1975, designating it #7 (southbound) and #8 (northbound). The Southern Railway joined Amtrak in 1979.

References

External links
Birmingham Special December 1941 timetable reproduced at Streamliner Schedules

Night trains of the United States
Railway services introduced in 1909
Passenger trains of the Norfolk and Western Railway
Passenger trains of the Pennsylvania Railroad
Passenger trains of the Southern Railway (U.S.)
Passenger rail transportation in Alabama
Passenger rail transportation in Delaware
Passenger rail transportation in Maryland
Passenger rail transportation in New Jersey
Passenger rail transportation in New York (state)
Passenger rail transportation in Tennessee
Passenger rail transportation in Virginia
Passenger rail transportation in Pennsylvania
Named passenger trains of the United States
Railway services discontinued in 1970